The canton of Tournan-en-Brie is a French former administrative division, located in the arrondissement of Melun, in the Seine-et-Marne département (Île-de-France région). It was disbanded following the French canton reorganisation which came into effect in March 2015.

Demographics

Composition 
The canton of Tournan-en-Brie was composed of 9 communes:

Châtres
Chaumes-en-Brie
Courquetaine
Favières
Gretz-Armainvilliers
Liverdy-en-Brie
Ozouer-le-Voulgis
Presles-en-Brie
Tournan-en-Brie

See also
Cantons of the Seine-et-Marne department
Communes of the Seine-et-Marne department

References

Tournan en brie
2015 disestablishments in France
States and territories disestablished in 2015